The Seven Heroes and Five Gallants is a 1994 Taiwanese television series produced by Chinese Television System (CTS) a few months after its prequel Justice Pao, which was also produced by Chao Ta-shen. Dozens of actors appeared in both series, but only Sze Yu and Tu Man-sheng reprised their roles. Fan Hung-hsuan and Lung Lung chose to portray new characters rather than their iconic roles.

Cast

Main cast

 Chang Fu-chien as Bao Zheng
 Danny Dun as Gongsun Ce
 Vincent Chiao as Zhan Zhao
 Tsao Hua-hsing as Wang Chao
 Chang Hui-yang as Ma Han
 Chang Yu-ming as Zhang Long
 Hsueh Feng-chin as Zhao Hu
 Sze Yu as Emperor Renzong of Song
 Lin Tzay-peir as Lu Fang
 Pi Kao-chiao as Min Xiuxiu, Lu Fang's wife
 Yu An-shun as Han Zhang
 Fu Lei as Xu Qing
 Tai Chih-yuan as Jiang Ping
 Sun Xing as Bai Yutang
 Tien Feng as Zhao Demou, Prince of Xiangyang
 Chang Feng as Ji Gao, Zhao Demou's strategist

Other cast
Note: Some actors portrayed more than 1 character.

 Yu Hsiao-fan as Min
 Lung Lung as Tu Shan
 Tao Shu as Xu Qing's mother
 Yang Huai-min as Ge Qing
 Chiao Hua-kuo as Wu Liang
 Chiu Yu-ting as Imperial Consort Lan
 Fan Hung-hsuan as Zhao Defang
 Sally Chen as Xinci
 Pai Bing-bing as Gu Atao
 Lung Tien-hsiang as Hu Si
 Chang Yu-yen as Li Shuangshuang
 Chao Shu-hai as Liu Qingfeng
 Hu Chin as Princess Mei
 Lu I-lung as Li Quan
 Lee Yu-lin as Ma Yougong
 Huang Chung-yu as Wang Hao
 Liu Ming as Granny of Jiangning
 Lee Kwan as wineshop owner
 Sung Ta-min as Ping Jianqiu
 Wu Ma as Ping Chang
 Chiu Yu-ting as Liu Feng
 Tseng Ya-chun as Feng Hua
 Henry Lo as Huo Shisan
 Lin Tzu-you as Xiniang
 Wang Hau as Yin Zhongyu
 Mimi Kung as Zhao Ling
 Chang Liu-chiung as Empress Dowager Li
 Chao Shu-hai as Shao Jianbo
 Tang Fu-hsiung as Liu Yu
 Lung Lung as Lei Xinghe
 Cheng Hsiu-ying as Qingyan
 Yu Heng as Zhang Zhao
 Hu Hsiang-ping as Wang Tao
 Tu Shan-ni as Su Hong
 Chiao Hua-kuo as Lu Ping
 Lu I-lung as Yan Zhengcheng
 Huang Chung-yu as Xin Wu
 Lee Hsing-wen as Chai Xinnong
 Wang Yu-wen as Lu Zhu'er
 Fei Yun as Yang Bin
 Yang Tse-chung as Zhao Shiquan
 Fang Wen-lin as Min Rourou
 Tu Wei as Min Zhong
 Lu Ti as Min Ziqian
 Lee Yu-lin as Li Qi
 Doze Niu as Li Yuhou
 Chang Chen-huan as Wang Meng
 Lei Ming as Li Shichang
 Wang Chang-chih as Deng Pingnan
 Hsiao Chiang as Yun Wenqiu
 Henry Lo as Wang Shiquan
 Jimmy Ni as Xiao Tianchong
 Yang Ching-huang as He Mutian
 Wang Jung as Yun Bingzhong
 Wang Chang-chih as Peng Yi
 Wen Shuai as Xu Ziqing
 Chiao Hua-kuo as Xiao Tianlin
 Chang Chi-ping as Zhang Yue
 Yu Hsiao-fan as Hanqing
 Tu Man-sheng as Pang Ji
 Lee Yu-lin as Sun Xun
 Kou Feng as Mo Shanhu
 Wang Hsiang as Lu Bin
 Brenda Wang as Ouyang Yunyi
 Yang Huai-min as Helian Peng
 Yeung Chung-yan as Tang Shaojun
 Yu Hsiao-fan as Du Xinyu
 Chang Shun-hsing as Li Wen
 Lin Wen-pin as Li Wu
 Hsieh Pin-nan as Gao Feng
 Hsu Wen-chuan as Bao Xing
 Tsao Chien as Du Zhongheng
 Chiu Yu-ting as Shui Jiping
 Luo Bin as Li Junnian
 Wen Shuai as Jiang Changsheng
 Yan Chung as Lu Yifan
 Wang Chi-sheng as Gu Jian
 Na Ta-ke as Zhao Gang

Segments

Theme songs

1994 Taiwanese television series debuts
1994 Taiwanese television series endings
Television shows based on The Seven Heroes and Five Gallants
Mandarin-language television shows
Chinese Television System original programming